Coelognathus erythrurus, commonly known as the Philippine rat snake, is a species of snake of the family Colubridae.

Geographic range
The snake is found in the Philippines and Indonesia.

Subspecies
 Coelognathus erythrurus celebensis (Jan, 1863)
 Coelognathus erythrurus erythrurus (Duméril, Bibron & Duméril, 1854)
 Coelognathus erythrurus manillensis Jan, 1863
 Coelognathus erythrurus psephenourus Leviton, 1979

References 

Reptiles described in 1854
Taxa named by André Marie Constant Duméril
Taxa named by Gabriel Bibron
Taxa named by Auguste Duméril
Reptiles of the Philippines
Reptiles of Indonesia
Reptiles of Malaysia
Colubrids